Acronicta noctivaga, the night-wandering dagger moth, is a moth of the family Noctuidae. It is found in north-eastern North America (including Wisconsin, New York, Maryland and Ontario).

The wingspan is about 32 mm. Adults are on wing from May to August depending on the location.

Recorded food plants include poplar.

External links
Images
Moths of Maryland

Acronicta
Moths of North America
Moths described in 1864